Luděk Mikloško (born 9 December 1961) is a Czech football coach and former professional footballer.

As a player, he was a goalkeeper who notably played in the Premier League for West Ham United where he played over 300 games. He also played in the Football League for Queens Park Rangers and in his native country for RH Cheb and Baník Ostrava. He was capped 40 times by Czechoslovakia and was present at the 1990 FIFA World Cup. He was later capped twice by the Czech Republic. 

Following retirement, Mikloško returned to West Ham and worked as the clubs goalkeeping coach before leaving in 2010. He has since moved back to the Czech Republic and works for a sporting investment agency.

Club career
Mikloško started his career in his native Czechoslovakia with Baník Ostrava.

Mikloško's talent was noted by West Ham United manager Lou Macari, who signed him in February 1990, just before his resignation and the appointment of Billy Bonds as his successor, for a fee of £300,000. His first game was on 18 February 1990 in a 2–2 away to Swindon Town. His fourth game was the second leg of the League Cup against Oldham Athletic. West Ham had lost the first leg, 6–0 with Phil Parkes in goal in what proved to be his last game for West Ham after an eleven-year association with the club. From this point until season 1997-98, Mikloško was the first-choice goalkeeper.

In season 1990-91 he played 56 games for West Ham including every league game as they were promoted as runners-up from the Second Division. This had included conceding only 16 goals in away games, the best in the league. West Ham also made the semi-finals of the FA Cup, before losing to Nottingham Forest, with Mikloško playing in all of their seven cup games. He was named Hammer of the Year in 1991. Although the Hammers were relegated the following season and missed out on being founder members of the new FA Premier League in 1992, he helped them win promotion back to the top flight at the first attempt — beginning a ten-year unbroken spell at this level. He is well remembered for a Man of the Match performance against Manchester United on the last day of the 1994–95 season where West Ham drew 1–1 with Manchester United at the Boleyn Ground to help secure Manchester United's rivals, Blackburn Rovers, their first league title in over 80 years. In his final season, he vied with Craig Forrest for the goalkeeper's position. His last game came on 6 December 1997 in a 2–0 away defeat by Derby County. Mikloško scored an own goal in the game. The following game he was replaced in goal by Forrest. A brave and excellent shot-stopper with a huge clearance kick, he played 374 times for the team.

Mikloško was sold to Queens Park Rangers in 1998 for a nominal fee after a successful loan spell. His last professional game came on 3 March 2001. In new manager, Ian Holloway's first game in charge, QPR lost 3–1 at home to Sheffield United. Later in 2001 he retired due to injury.

International career
Mikloško received 40 caps for Czechoslovakia and two caps for the Czech Republic.

Coaching career
After retirement, Mikloško returned to West Ham to take up a goalkeeping coaching role. He left the club in March 2010; neither club nor Mikloško commented as to why.

Personal life
He now resides back in the Czech Republic and works for a sporting investment agency.

Honours
Individual
Toulon Tournament Best Goalkeeper (2): 1980, 1982
PFA Team of the Year: 1990–91 Second Division, 1992–93 First Division

References

External links
 
 Jan Palička: Luděk Mikloško: Fotbal v Anglii je jako jiná dimenze, MF DNES 
 

1961 births
Living people
Sportspeople from Prostějov
Czech footballers
Association football goalkeepers
Czech Republic international footballers
Czechoslovak footballers
1990 FIFA World Cup players
Czechoslovakia international footballers
Dual internationalists (football)
English Football League players
Premier League players
West Ham United F.C. players
Queens Park Rangers F.C. players
FK Hvězda Cheb players
FC Baník Ostrava players
West Ham United F.C. non-playing staff
Association football goalkeeping coaches
Czech expatriate footballers
Expatriate footballers in England
Czechoslovak expatriate footballers
Czechoslovak expatriate sportspeople in England
Czech expatriate sportspeople in England